The Savage Amusement is an original novel written by David Bishop and based on the long-running British science fiction comic strip Judge Dredd. At the time of publication (1993) Bishop was editor of the Judge Dredd Megazine.

Synopsis
Rookie Judge Harry Brisco is taking his gruelling final assessment to decide if he is fit to be a full street judge, and Judge Dredd is assigned as the supervisor who can make or break him. As they hit the streets a mystery virus begins killing all the clones in the city – and Dredd himself is a clone. Meanwhile, Mega-City One is about to hold an election for its new mayor, and opinion polls indicate that undead mass-murderer Judge Death may win. Brisco is about to face the toughest challenge of his life.

Continuity
Brisco first appeared as a cadet in the 1985 story Thirteenth Assessment in 2000 AD #421, written by John Wagner and Alan Grant.

External links
The Savage Amusement at the 2000 AD fansite (note: the reference to Judge Dredd in the synopsis should read "Judge Death," and the "reprint material" section erroneously refers to another story).

Novels by David Bishop
Judge Dredd novels
1993 British novels
Novels set in the 22nd century